Fulad Kola (also Romanized as Fūlād Kolā) is a village in Aliabad Rural District, in the Central District of Qaem Shahr County, Mazandaran Province, Iran. At the 2006 census, its population was 756, in 201 families.

References 

Populated places in Qaem Shahr County